Garry De Graef (born 21 October 1974 in Belgium) is a Belgian retired footballer who last played for Houtvenne in his home country.

Career

De Graef started his senior career with Royal Antwerp. In 2008, he signed for SC Paderborn 07 in the German 2. Bundesliga, where he made eighty-eight appearances and scored two goals. After that, he played for Lierse, Turnhout, Lierse Kempenzonen, and Houtvenne.

Honours

Player 
Royal Antwerp

 UEFA Cup Winners' Cup: 1992-93 (runners-up)

References

External links 
 Your heroes of yesteryear: Garry de Graef 
 Routine Garry De Graef must provide the necessary experience in the title hunt of Lierse 
 Ski fanatic Garry De Graef has to give up his annual winter sports holiday for Christmas football with Lierse 
 Garry De Graef, step by step higher
 Ex-professional footballer now café boss: “I mainly focus on coffee”

1974 births
Belgian footballers
Association football defenders
Royal Antwerp F.C. players
Helmond Sport players
TOP Oss players
RKC Waalwijk players
De Graafschap players
SC Paderborn 07 players
Lierse S.K. players
KFC Turnhout players
Living people
KFC Houtvenne players